Colchester was a parliamentary constituency represented in the House of Commons of the Parliament of the United Kingdom. It elected one Member of Parliament (MP) by the first past the post system of election between 1885 and 1983. Before then, it elected two. In 1983, following boundary changes, the seat of Colchester was abolition and replaced by Colchester North and Colchester South and Maldon. It was reinstated in 1997, the boundaries of the current seat of Colchester being similar.

List

References

Colchester
Colchester
Politics of Colchester
1880s in Essex
1890s in Essex
1900s in Essex
1910s in Essex
1920s in Essex
1930s in Essex
1940s in Essex
1950s in Essex
1960s in Essex
1970s in Essex
1980s in Essex
MPs of Colchester